Zootime is a compilation album by the British band, Mystery Jets, consisting of tracks from their UK only debut Making Dens, and from the Flotsam and Jetsam EP.

Track listing
All tracks written by Mystery Jets.
 "Diamonds in the Dark"
 "Inside Four Walls"
 "Scarecrows in the Rain"
 "The Boy Who Ran Away"
 "Soluble in Air"
 "Horse Drawn Cart"
 "Zoo Time"
 "You Can't Fool Me Dennis"
 "Purple Prose of Cairo"
 "Little Bag of Hair"
 "Umbrellahead"
 "Crosswords"

References 

2007 albums
Mystery Jets albums
Dim Mak Records albums

ja:メイキング・デンズ